Oops! I Did It Again: The Best of Britney Spears (stylized in lowercase) is a greatest hits album by American singer Britney Spears. It was released on June 15, 2012 through the Camden label. The album contains some early singles but is considerably filled with album and bonus tracks from her studio albums ...Baby One More Time (1999), Oops!... I Did It Again (2000), Britney (2001), In the Zone (2003) and Circus (2008). The album contains no tracks from Blackout (2007) nor Femme Fatale (2011). Its issuance with no official press release or announcement took both fans and critics by surprise. When fans on Twitter asked about the album, global distributor Sony Music stated they had no knowledge of the album. It was not released in the United States.

Critical reception
Oops! I Did It Again: The Best of Britney Spears is, according to Stephen Thomas Erlewine of AllMusic, "not terrible, but not the best-of and not worth the time of most fans, either". He called the album "not so much a best-of collection" of Spears' career, but rather "an odd recap of her first act". Erlewine declared that while the album does include major hits such as "...Baby One More Time" (1998) and "I'm a Slave 4 U" (2001), it "misses the mark" in excluding "(You Drive Me) Crazy" (1999) and "Toxic" (2004). He noted that mentioned songs are excluded in favor of album cuts and songs that appeared as bonus tracks on international editions of her albums.

Track listing

Release history

References

Britney Spears compilation albums
2012 greatest hits albums
Sony Music compilation albums